Canal Creek is a rural locality in the Livingstone Shire, Queensland, Australia.

Geography 
The ridge of the Pointer Range forms the south-western boundary of the locality.

 North Pointer 
 The Pointer 
 Mount Jardine 
 Pleasant Hill 
 Conical Mountain 
 Charley Peak 
 The Gate Mountain 

Three creeks enter through the locality from the north (Shoalwater) flowing south, Alligator Creek to Canoona/Jardine and Canal Creek (from which the locality presumably takes its name) and Werribee Creek to Rossmoya. These creeks are ultimately tributaries to the Fitzroy River which enters the Coral Sea between Thompsons Point and Port Alma.

There are a number of protected areas in the locality, including:

 North Pointer Conservation Park in the south-west of the locality
 Alligator Creek State Forest in the north and centre of the locality
 Canal Creek State Forest in the centre of the locality
 Werribee State Forest in the north-east of the locality

The predominant land use is grazing on native vegetation, plantation forestry and a small amount of cropping.

History 
On 19 December 1943 a USA military aircraft crashed at Canal Creek Cattle Station and 31 people were killed. The C47 aircraft of 22nd Troop Carrier Squadron 374th Transport Group was flying from Townsville to Brisbane with a stop in Rockhampton. The port engine caught fire, which caused an explosion and the plane crashed and all 31 people on board were killed. The aircraft was carrying 20 USA military personnel, 8 Australian military personnel, and three civilians (one from the YMCA, one from the Salvation Army, and a war photographer). The memorial was organised by Yeppoon resident John Millroy. It was the 2nd worst aircrash in Australia's history (Bakers Creek air crash in June 1943 killed 40 people).

Education 
There are no schools in Canal Creek. The nearest primary school is in Millman. The nearest secondary schools are in Yeppoon and Kawana, Rockhampton.

References

External links 

  — includes casualty list

Shire of Livingstone
Localities in Queensland